The 1982 Wyoming gubernatorial election took place on November 2, 1982. Incumbent Democratic Governor Edgar Herschler ran for re-election to a third term. He faced former State House Speaker Warren A. Morton in the general election after several prominent Republicans, including then-Congressman Dick Cheney, declined to challenge him. However, Herschler remained personally popular and the national political environment favored Democrats, and he had little difficulty defeating Morton to win a third term. In doing so, Herschler became the first (and, with the subsequent adoption of gubernatorial term limits, likely the last) Governor of Wyoming to win three terms in office.

Democratic primary

Candidates
 Edgar Herschler, incumbent Governor
 Pat McGuire, rancher

Results

Republican Primary

Candidates
 Warren A. Morton, former Speaker of the Wyoming House of Representatives
 Rex G. Welty, Jr., Mayor of Afton
 Carl A. Johnson, perennial candidate

Results

Results

References

1982 Wyoming elections
1982
Wyoming
November 1982 events